Será is the 12th studio album recorded by Spanish band Presuntos Implicados released on September 16, 2008. The album was the first since the departure of Sole Giménez in 2006 and marked the debut of new singer Lydia.

Track listing
This information adapted from Allmusic.

References

2008 albums
Spanish-language albums